Asiamerica was a supercontinent formed from the Laurasian landmass and separated by shallow continental seas from Eurasia to the West and eastern North America to the East. This region incorporated what is now politically China, Mongolia, western United States and western Canada. Fossil evidence tells us that it was home to many dinosaurs and archaic mammals. It existed during the Late Cretaceous to Eocene epochs, and existed again during Quaternary Pleistocene epoch. It will exist again for the third time within 50 million years.

See also

References
The early evolution of the Tyrannosauridae in Asia
Dinosaurs (sub-heading The Earth of the Dinosaur)
Palaeos website

Historical continents
Cretaceous paleogeography
Paleocene paleogeography
Eocene paleogeography
Natural history of Asia
Natural history of North America